West Union Residential Historic District is a national historic district located at West Union, Doddridge County, West Virginia. It encompasses 85 contributing residential buildings, built between about 1858 and 1940.  They are representative of popular architectural styles from the late-19th century and early-20th century including Colonial Revival and Queen Anne. Notable non-residential buildings include the West Union Baptist Church, Emmanuel United Methodist Church, and Doddridge County High School.

It was listed on the National Register of Historic Places in 2010.

References

National Register of Historic Places in Doddridge County, West Virginia
Houses on the National Register of Historic Places in West Virginia
Historic districts in Doddridge County, West Virginia
Colonial Revival architecture in West Virginia
Queen Anne architecture in West Virginia
Houses in Doddridge County, West Virginia
Historic districts on the National Register of Historic Places in West Virginia